Kiekko.tk is a java-based ice hockey game, which has over 31,000 registered accounts (a majority of them are Finnish ). The game is developed by Jouko and Mikko Pynnönen. The game is free to play, but some features such as starting a team have to be paid for with either SMS-messages, Credit card or Phone call.

History 
Kiekko.tk started in the beginning of 2004 as a simple java-applet, which did not have a registration feature and only 10 players were able to play the game at the same time. Graphics were primitive; players were Smileys (also known as a "smiley version"), the puck was square, and the hockey rink's entries pretty rough. The game has been developed due to its number of active players. Next a list of the most important features:

 user registration, 08.04.2004
 saved statistics (goals and assists)
 human type characters
 exact hockey rink's dimensions and improved graphics
 creating a team, 21.04.2004
 VIP-usership and SMS system, summer 2004
 saved goal replays, October 2004
 hooking and penalties, September 2006
 experience'o'meter, August 2007
 auto-play rooms, September 2007
 revised website's outlook, October 2007
 switching arena's seat's colors, December 2007
 spectator's graphic outlook revise, December 2007
 separate ranking points for every game format (3vs3, 4vs4, 5vs5), May 2008
 optional attribute points for games and experimental rooms, October 2008
 new graphic pack, October 2011
 ranking points only from team autoplays, April 2012

Gameplay 
Every player takes control of one player in the rink. The player is controlled by a mouse. Goalies cannot be controlled, as they are computer controlled. To practice, players can join training rooms where players are allowed to leave the rink whenever they see fit. Players can also join a team  and play team matches. Players are able to spectate these matches as well as training matches. By clicking and holding the left mouse button, the puck can be passed or shot. By clicking the right mouse button, an automatic pass is sent to a teammate closest to the cursor the moment the right mouse button is released. To increase the competition of the game, members have organised leagues.

Rankings 
There are four rankings in Kiekko.tk. Novice, Amateur, Pro, and Elite. Members are given these rankings based on the number of hours played. Members who have played under four hours are novices. The other rankings go as follows:
10% Elite
30% Pro
30% Amateur
30% Novice

Moderators 
Moderators are assigned to ensure that members behave and play the game in a decent manner. Members failing to comply with the Kiekko regulations can be muted by them. Regular members are able to report members using the following command: /report *nickname* *reason of report*

Technology 
 Game server, server-side code was written in C language (compiler GCC).
 Web-interface was developed with dynamic content development system called CWS, which combines the flexibility of JSP- and ASP-like tags with the power and sophisticated features of C++, supports FastCGI.
 MySQL-database
 A piece of middleware written in Perl, working as the glue between the game server and the database.
 The game Applet is written in Java and is developed with J2SE1.4.2.

External links 
 Official site
 Official site in English
 Finland - Netherlands video
 article about the game in Helsingin Sanomat.
 article and short video about the game

2004 video games
Massively multiplayer online games
Video games developed in Finland
Java platform games